The Ugandan national cricket team toured Kenya in December 1959 and played one three-day match against the Kenyan team. It was part of a series of occasional matches against countries in east Africa which would eventually lead to a formal triangular tournament being introduced in 1967.

Only match

References

1959 in Kenyan cricket
Ugandan cricket tours abroad